Back to the Basement is the eleventh studio album by punk rock band The Queers, released in 2010.

Release
On June 3, 2010, Back to the Basement was announced for release in four months' time.

Track listing

Personnel
Credits adapted from the album's liner notes.
The Queers
 Joe Queer (Joe King) – lead vocals, guitar, producer
 Dangerous Dave (Dave Swain) – bass guitar, backing vocals, producer
 Hog Log – drums

Additional performers
 Platelunch Danny – guitar, backing vocals
 Thomas Habit – bass guitar, backing vocals

Production
 Shelby P. – audio engineer, mixing engineer
 Johnny Love – mastering

Artwork
 Paolo Proserpio – photographs
 Kyle McQueen – illustrations
 Leslie Hampton – layout and design

References

The Queers albums
Asian Man Records albums